Sean Zimmerman (born May 24, 1987) is an American former professional ice hockey defenseman. He most recently played for the Orlando Solar Bears of the ECHL. Born in Denver, Colorado Zimmerman represented the United States at the 2007 World Junior Ice Hockey Championships helping Team USA win a Bronze medal.

Playing career
Zimmerman played Major junior with the Spokane Chiefs of the Western Hockey League (WHL). He played four season with Spokane registering 10 goals and 59 points to go with 165 PIMs in 270 games.
He is brother of Washington nationals player Ryan Zimmerman 
He was drafted in 2005 by the New Jersey Devils in the sixth round (170th overall). After seeing time in the Devils farm system he was traded in September 2008 from New Jersey to the Phoenix Coyotes. New Jersey received Kevin Cormier in exchange for Zimmerman. He attended Coyotes training camp that same year, but did not make the team and was assigned to the minor leagues. In the minors he split time between Phoenix's American Hockey League (AHL) affiliate the San Antonio Rampage and their Central Hockey League (CHL) affiliate the Arizona Sundogs. Zimmerman recorded 2 goals and 5 points in 56 games with the two clubs. He again participated in Coyotes training camp the following season, but was once again sent to the minors. He played in 72 games during the year for the Rampage and improved his point total to 9 and added a +13 rating (up from a combined -10 the season before). At the NHL trade deadline Zimmerman, along with a sixth round pick in the 2010 draft, was traded by Phoenix to the Vancouver Canucks in exchange for Mathieu Schneider.

During the off season Zimmerman re-signed with the Canucks organization. However, Vancouver traded him shortly into the season to the Florida Panthers in exchange for Nathan Paetsch. Just two months later on December 9, 2010 Florida traded him and a conditional 7th round pick to the Boston Bruins for Jeff LoVecchio and Jordan Knackstedt. On February 27, 2011, Zimmerman was on the move again for the third time in the season when he was dealt by the Bruins along with Brian McGrattan to the Anaheim Ducks for David Laliberte and Stefan Chaput.

On September 13, 2012, Zimmerman returned to his native state, signing as a free agent with the Denver Cutthroats of the CHL.  He played with the team through the 2013–14 season. However, in August 2014, he became a free agent when the team suspended operations, effective immediately.

On September 8, 2014, the Colorado Eagles announced that they had signed Zimmerman.

After helping guide the Eagles as Captain to their first Kelly Cup in his third season with the club in 2016–17, Zimmerman left his home state as a free agent to sign a one-year deal with the Orlando Solar Bears on August 8, 2017.

International play

In 2007 Zimmerman represented the United States at the World Junior Championships. In seven games he registered a +1 rating and six PIMs. Team USA defeated Finland in the opening round of the play-offs 6–3, but lost to Canada in their next game 2–1. They rebounded in the Bronze medal game to defeat host Sweden 2–1 giving Zimmerman his first and only international medal.

Career statistics

Regular season and playoffs

International

All statistics taken from NHL.com

Awards and honors

References

External links

1987 births
American men's ice hockey defensemen
Albany River Rats players
Arizona Sundogs players
Colorado Eagles players
Denver Cutthroats players
Ice hockey people from Denver
Living people
Lowell Devils players
New Jersey Devils draft picks
Orlando Solar Bears (ECHL) players
Providence Bruins players
Rochester Americans players
San Antonio Rampage players
Spokane Chiefs players
Trenton Devils players